Falkland Harbour is a harbour along the southwest side of Powell Island in the South Orkney Islands. It was charted by Norwegian whaling captain Petter Sorlle in 1912–13, and named for the floating whale factory Falkland which was badly damaged while entering the harbour in the 1912–13 season.

References 

Powell Island
Ports and harbours of the South Orkney Islands